T.I.N.A. (an acronym for This Is New Africa) is the debut studio album by English-Ghanaian recording artist Fuse ODG, released on 31 October 2014 through 3 Beat Records.

Singles
"Azonto", the first single released from T.I.N.A., was released on 27 October 2011. It was a commercial success, peaking at number 7 on the UK Singles Chart.

"Antenna" was released as the second single from the album. The single was released on May 31, 2012. It peaked at number 30 on the UK Singles Chart.

"Million Pound Girl (Badder Than Bad)" was released as the third single from the album. The song was released on 27 December 2013. It peaked at number 5 on the UK Singles Chart.

"Dangerous Love" was released as the fourth single from the album. The song was released on 16 May 2014. It managed to peak at number 3 on the UK Singles Chart, becoming his highest charting single in that country to date.

"T.I.N.A." was released as the fifth single from the album. The song was released on 17 October 2014. It managed to peak at number 9 on the UK Singles Chart, becoming his fourth top 10 single in that country.

"Thinking About U" was released as the sixth single from the album.

Track listing

Charts

Certifications

Release history

References

Fuse ODG albums
2014 debut albums
3 Beat Records albums